Borucak is a village in the Kıbrıscık District, Bolu Province, Turkey. Its population is 45 (2021).

References

Villages in Kıbrıscık District